PW Telescopii, also known as HD 183806 or simply PW Tel, is a solitary variable star located in the southern constellation Telescopium. It has an average apparent magnitude of 5.58, making it faintly visible to the naked eye. Based on parallax measurements from the Gaia satellite, the star is estimated to be 395 light years distant. The value is somewhat constrained, having an uncertainty of 26%. At its current distance, PW Tel's brightness is diminished by 0.05 magnitudes due to interstellar dust.

PW Tel was first noticed to vary in brightness in observations taken in 1978 by Pierre Renson. The star was confirmed to be variable and was given the variable star designation PW Telescopii in 1981. Further observations by Jean Manfroid in 1985 improved earlier data, including the star's period. PW Tel is an α2 CVn variable that has an amplitude of 0.011 magnitudes within the visual passband and a period of 2.92 days.

With a stellar classification of A0 Vp (SrCr), PW Tel is a chemically peculiar A-type main-sequence star. It has been recognised as an Ap star, as indicated by the "p" suffix, since the early 20th century, and it shows an overabundance of strontium and chromium in its spectrum. The abundance of some metals in the spectrum is several hundred times higher than in the Sun and it has an overall metallicity of [Fe/H] = 1.09, but this only reflects levels of those elements in the photosphere, not the whole star.

PW Tel is metal enriched, having an iron abundance over 10 times that of the Sun.

References

Ap stars
A-type main-sequence stars
Telescopium (constellation)
Telescopii, 63
Telescopii, PW
CD-13296
183806
96178
7416